University Music Society may refer to:

 Edinburgh University Music Society
 Oxford University Music Society
 Sydney University Musical Society
 University Musical Society, University of Michigan